Giulia Vetrano (born 5 December 2005) is an Italian swimmer. She competed in the women's 4 × 200 metre freestyle relay at the 2020 Summer Olympics.

References

External links
 

2005 births
Living people
Italian female swimmers
Italian female freestyle swimmers
Olympic swimmers of Italy
Swimmers at the 2020 Summer Olympics
Sportspeople from Turin
21st-century Italian women